KWLS (107.9 FM) is an American radio station that broadcasts a classic country format serving Winfield, Kansas.

History
107.9 FM signed in 1980 as KWKS, an adult contemporary station licensed to and serving Winfield (as is stated in their call letters). It changed its call letters to KSOK-FM in 1995. The station was sold to Sherman Broadcasting, with hopes of bringing an urban-formatted station to Kansas and to compete against KDGS.

Hot 107.9 Jamz
The "Hot 107.9 Jamz" format debuted on July 1, 2000, with the call letters KSJM and an Urban AC format. The station's first song was "Got To Be Real" by Cheryl Lynn. The station was the Wichita affiliate of the Tom Joyner Morning Show. In 2002, the station started adding Jazz into its programming after the demise of Smooth Jazz station KWSJ (now News Talk KNSS-FM). The station's first studios were located in the Equity Bank building at Kellogg and Rock in East Wichita. A few years later, the station relocated its studios to the Carriage Parkway shopping center near Central and Edgemoor.

In 2004, KSJM added hip hop to the playlist, shifting towards an Urban Contemporary format. The station also picked up Doug Banks for morning drive. Banks' morning show was later replaced by a local morning show. In 2007, KSJM's local morning show was replaced by Steve Harvey.

In April 2004, Sherman Broadcasting announced they would enter a joint partnership with Carter Broadcast Group (owners of Kansas City urban station KPRS and gospel KPRT). The merger was approved by the FCC three months later.

Though the station was noted for serving a niche audience to the market near Wichita, the station had moderate to low ratings due to the location of its transmitter being situated near Winfield, which is over 50 miles from Wichita.

US 107.9
On October 10, 2007, the two companies sold the station to Larry Steckline's AG Network Group due to declining financial revenues.

On January 15, 2008, AG Network flipped KSJM to Country as KWLS "US-107.9." KWLS got its call letters from an AM station in Pratt that was formerly owned by Steckline in the 1980s and 1990s.

In 2020, an attempted sale of the station faltered. On March 2, 2020, in Sedgwick County District Court, Larry Steckline, via his LS Media, sued Mike and Tina Andra, owners of "Wichita Union Stockyards," for an alleged failure to make agreed installment payments to buy the station. Steckline claimed that the Andras, along with their "Giddyup Radio, LLC," were supposed to pay $2.125 million, over five years, in installments, but had stopped paying the previous year.

References

External links
 KWLS Radio official website

WLS
Classic country radio stations in the United States
Radio stations established in 1980
1980 establishments in Kansas